The 1972 SMU Mustangs football team represented Southern Methodist University (SMU) as a member of the Southwest Conference (SWC) during the 1972 NCAA University Division football season. Led by Hayden Fry in his 11th and final season as head coach, the Mustangs compiled an overall record of 7–4 with a conference mark of 4–3, tying for second place in the SWC.

Schedule

Roster

References

SMU
SMU Mustangs football seasons
SMU Mustangs football